Amazing Grace is a 1994 album by Norwegian singer Sissel Kyrkjebø released in Japan.

Track listing
 アメイジング・グレイス (Amazing Grace)
 愛を捧げて (Tenn et lys for dem)
 つらい別れ (Jeg trenger deg)
 熱愛 (Blod i brann)
 サマー・ドリーム (Sommerdrøm)
 ソリア・モリア~幻の夢の城 (Soria Moria)
 サムホエア (Somewhere)
 すべての山に登れ (Se over fjellet)
 サマータイム (Summertime)
 オンリー・ラヴ (Kjærlighet)
 愛は微笑みの中に (I ditt smil)
 恋が始まる時に (Inn til deg)
 永遠の誓い (Det skal lyse en sol)
 ローズ (Frøet)

References

Sissel Kyrkjebø albums
1994 albums